Keshav Vaman Bhole (23 May 1896 – 1967), also known as Keshavrao Bhole, was a well-known music composer and critic in Indian cinema.

He was the founder of a theatrical company called Natya-Manvantara.  In 1933, he was admitted to Prabhat Film Company as a music composer.  
His works include:
 Amrit Manthan (1934)
 Sant Tukaram (1936)
 Kunku/Duniya Na Mane (1937)
 Sant Dnyaneshwar (1940)
 Das Baje/10 O'Clock (1940)  
 Ram Shastri (1944)

As a critique, he wrote under the pseudonyms 'Ekalavya' and 'Suddha Saranga'.

References

External links 

1896 births
1967 deaths
20th-century Indian musicians